Penn Hills High School is a public secondary school located in Penn Hills, east of Pittsburgh, Pennsylvania, United States. It is the sole high school operated by the Penn Hills School District. In the 2018–19 school year, enrollment was reported as 1,186 pupils in 9th through 12th grades.

Building
The new $58 million Penn Hills High School building was opened on January 3, 2013. The school was designed by Architectural Innovations. There are two gymnasiums, with the main one seating 1,900. The auditorium has about 1,000 seats with state-of-the-art lighting and sound-systems. All classrooms include Promethean World interactive whiteboards. The building features large skylights that can be seen from both the top and bottom floors to promote natural lighting. The school's new HVAC system was expected to save 30 percent in energy costs.

In 2012, the Pittsburgh Steelers funded a new $200,000 football field for the school.

Extracurriculars
The students have access to a wide variety of clubs, activities and an extensive sports program.

The Penn Hills Marching Band travels to football games and marches in a variety of parades throughout the year. Every year they return to Kennywood to perform, and take another trip out-of-state. Past band trips include Walt Disney World, Chicago, and Six Flags. The school also produces Gene Kelly Awards winning musicals and two plays per year.

Clubs at Penn Hills High School include the Library Assistants, Lab Assistants, Front Office Assistants, Athletic Office Assistants, Bible Club, Medical Careers Club, Key Club, Future Business Leaders of America, Yearbook Staff, PennPoints Newspaper Staff, French Club, Spanish Club, German Club, Games Club, National Honor Society, and Role Models. All freshmen students are matched with junior and senior Role Models to promote academic achievement, leadership, school spirit, and team-building skills. The school also sponsors teams for Calcusolve, Hometown High-Q, and Academic WorldQuest.

Sports
The teams are referred to as the Penn Hills Indians and Lady Indians, and the student cheering section is known as the Tribe. The district funds:

Varsity

Boys
Baseball - 5A
Basketball- 5A
Cross Country - AAA
Football - 5A
Golf - AAA
Soccer - AAAA
Swimming and Diving - AAA
Track and Field - AAA
Volleyball - AAA
Wrestling - AAA

Girls
Basketball - AAAA
Cross Country - AAA
Golf - AAA
Soccer (Fall) - AAA
Softball - AAAA
Swimming and Diving - AAA
Girls' Tennis - AAA
Track and Field - AAA
Volleyball - AAA

According to PIAA directory January 2016

Notable alumni
 Barry Church – professional football player in the National Football League (NFL)
 Aaron Donald  – professional football player in the NFL and 3x Defensive Player of the Year
 Scott Edgar – college basketball coach
 Tom Flynn – professional football player in the NFL
 Bill Fralic – professional football player in the NFL
 Bill Fulton – professional baseball player
 Kevin Peter Hall – actor
 Treyvon Hester – professional football player in the NFL
 George Karl – college basketball player; professional basketball player and head coach in the National Basketball Association (NBA)
 Abby Lee Miller – reality TV star
 Anthony Morelli – professional football player in the NFL and Arena Football League; college football player at Penn State
 Guy Primus – businessman and entrepreneur
 Jake Schifino – professional football player in the NFL
 Herb Sendek – college basketball head coach
 Tom Tumulty – professional football player in the NFL
 Damon Young – writer

References

External links

Penn Hills School District official website

Public high schools in Pennsylvania
Education in Pittsburgh area